Lunch Monkeys is a British situation comedy, first shown on BBC Three in 2008.

Overview
Lunch Monkeys by David Isaac is a BBC Three comedy series, produced by Channel X North, set in the administration department of fictional personal injury law firm Fox Cranford. The stories focus on the support staffers who work in the postroom of a Mancunian firm of solicitors. The postroom workers tend to be immature, lazy, disorganised, and unproductive, including their supervisor—the firm's office manager—all of whom constantly frustrate the efforts of the firm's managing partner.

The series is made by Manchester indie Channel K and series 2 went into production in April 2010. The BBC Press Office announced the return of the six-episode new series on 3 February 2011.

On 27 May 2011 it was revealed by BBC Three's Controller Zai Bennett, that the show had been axed along with fellow BBC Three Comedies Coming of Age and How Not to Live Your Life. He explained that "They were good to the channel, but have had their time,".

Episode list

Pilot (2008)
 "Admin"

Series 1 (2009)
 "Spacepants": Introduction of Shelley the new girl. Kenny is trying to ask Tania out, but only succeeds in getting sidetracked into finding spacepants.
 "Dog Boy Darrel": Hypnotism is used to make Darrel bark on command.
 "Ice Pops": Asif and Shelley sell ice-pops in the office, Asif tries to impress Lee Ann.
 "Fire": Darrel becomes fire marshal but annoys everyone in the office.
 "Temp": Darrel and the temp get engaged after one date, however, she isn't all she seems.
 "Ghost": Kenny convinces Asif there is a ghost in the office.

Series 2 (2011)
 "Super-Visor": Tania has her first appraisal, Asif scores a legal victory.
 "Monkey Love": Darrel has a crush on Mike's daughter, Shelley organises a client presentation.
 "Smoke and Mirrors": Shelley wakes up in the office with a hangover, while rumours fly about Kenny and Tania's sex life
 "Dream a Little Dream": Tania has planned a motivational exercise involving hats and five-year life plans.
 "Who's the daddy?" : Darrel's dad Pat turns up doing odd jobs at Fox Cranford, while Kenny is stressed because everyone thinks he's boring.
 "Big trouble in little Cranford" : They all make a party for Mike as they think he is depressed.

Main cast
Nigel Havers as Mike Cranford
Siân Reeves as Gloria Stevens
Chris Hannon as Darrel Wadsworth
Abdullah Afzal as Asif Khan
Rachel Rae as Shelley Benson
Jessica Hall as Tania MacGuire
Christian Foster as Kenny Graham
Steve John Shepherd as Charlie Brierson
Camilla Beeput as Lee Ann Brown
Michael Taylor as Swanney
Kulvinder Ghir as Mohammed Khan

International broadcast
In Australia, season one aired on ABC2 each Monday at 9pm from 28 June 2010.

References

External links
 
 
 Lunch Monkeys
  Channel K

2000s British sitcoms
2010s British sitcoms
2008 British television series debuts
2011 British television series endings
BBC high definition shows
BBC television sitcoms
English-language television shows